Aoniraptor is a megaraptoran theropod from the Late Cretaceous of Argentina (Huincul Formation).

Discovery and naming
The holotype, MPCA-Pv 804/1 to 804/25, which consists of the last sacral vertebra, six proximal caudal vertebrae, four mid-caudal vertebrae, and five haemal arches, was recovered by Matias Motta from the Violante Farm, part of the Huincul Formation. It was discovered in 2010, but only formally described in 2016.

Aoniraptor has been considered as synonymous with the theropod Gualicho, described from the same formation, due to the similarities of their caudal vertebrae. If found to be true, the name Gualicho would have precedent.

Aranciaga Rolando et al. in 2020 performed a comparative analysis between Aoniraptor and Gualicho, and found many differences between the two.

Description

Etymology 
Aoniraptor comes from the Tehuelche language word "Aoni", which means south, and the Latin word "raptor", meaning thief. The specific name, libertatem, comes from the Latin word for freedom, as it was discovered on the bicentennial of Argentina's independence from Spain in 1810.

See also 
 2016 in paleontology

References 

Megaraptorans
Cenomanian life
Turonian life
Late Cretaceous dinosaurs of South America
Cretaceous Argentina
Fossils of Argentina
Huincul Formation
Fossil taxa described in 2016